Fletcher's Meadow Secondary School is a high school located in Brampton, Ontario, Canada.

Despite the school's recent construction, its population is growing at a rate faster than the supportable growth rate. For the 2010 and 2011 school year the boundary for the school changed, thus dropping the student population by 300 students to a more manageable population of 1700 students.

Unique mathematics program
Fletcher's Meadow Secondary School has a very unique approach to teaching mathematics. The focus at Fletcher's Math is away from rote memorization and directly onto abstract thinking and knowledge. They administer this through "thinking assessments" in which a student is given an open ended problem with certain constrains and the student is to come up with a general solution, that the user reading can input any values that follow their format and their answer will be correct. It makes the student write down which restrictions are allowed for the question, why they chose particular variables and formulas and makes the student explain why their solution is correct and well explained. Examples of level 4+ work could include having multiple solutions, having a generalization formula that works for the general case P(n). These usually follow the format goal, plan, execution (base case is shown here), and then reflection. These thinking assessments allow one to think openly about a problem and write a general solution that can give the reader reading it, an infinite array of solutions for the problem, and really shows the student has thought out of the box, and connected the ideas and meaning behind the mathematics taught to them to the work they are doing. In addition to this, Fletcher's has started to beta test grade-less tests, rather than students focusing on grades, they focus on the concepts they do not learn, the teachers assess the students through (usually weekly) assessments that test on concepts, which gives the student, the ability to go back and learn concepts, rather than chase marks. This approach with thinking assessments and focusing on concept and not grades has allowed Fletcher's graduates to go onto university level mathematics and be prepared for abstract concepts, without computation and sole theory.

An example of a Calculus and Vectors exam level thinking question is the following:

Describe the procedure for a general formula of a cubic function f(x) in the form f(x) = ax3 + bx2 + cx + d, where f(x) goes through the origin, f(1) must be an integer, there is an inflection point at x = 3 and there is a local extrema at x = -2.

DECA Team
Fletcher's Meadow Secondary School participates in the annual DECA competition, and has become renowned for their transition from an underdog team to a known competitor. Fletcher's also has one of the DECA biggest chapters in all of Ontario. Fletcher's DECA completely revitalized their program with the executives from 2017 & 2018  (lead by Amrita Bhachu and Fayk Chaudhry) choosing to run the club on the philosophy that no individual should be denied entry, but given equal opportunity to learn and experience DECA. This along with unique teaching methods in the past year and has since sent many individuals from their chapter to DECA Provincials and also sending some to represent Ontario at DECA's International Career Development Conference in 2017, 2018. In the year 2018, Fletcher's won over 14 medallions DECA Provincials. In the years 2017 and 2018, Fletcher's has sent students such as Balpreet Cheema, Karanveer Cheema, Muhammad Fayk Chaudhry, Charmi Sanghvi, and Manpreet Sandhu to participate in ICDC, either in competitive events or in the leader academies. 

The school also used to host an intra-school competition known as DECA Apprentice. In it, small teams compete in a variety of different challenges that emulate those of the business world, such as pitching an idea, budgeting, teamwork and collaboration. The competition is a blend of the DECA case competition and NBC's reality show The Apprentice. Teams are given a time-frame in order to complete a task and are graded on the quality of their work. In the end, the team with the highest total score wins a prize, and there are two runners-up.

Robotics team
Fletcher's Meadow Secondary School participates in the annual  FIRST Robotics Competition & VEX Competitions. They started a team in 2011 and have been active since then.

In 2012, the team participated in two competitions: GTR East at Oshawa and GTR West at Hershey Centre. In 2018, Fletcher's team of juniors was selected as VEX Robotics team captains at a regional tournament. 

Awards won by Team 3705:
2011 - GTR West Animation Award
2012 - Safety Animation Award (globally won by 3705)
2012 - GTR West - placed 11th in qualification rounds and had the second best record of 8-2-0

Apart from FIRST, students also participate in the Skills Canada Challenges:

Robotics Team of 4:
2011 - Silver Medal at Peel Technological Skills Challenge
2012 - Gold Medal at Peel Technological Skills Challenge
2019 - Silver Medal at Peel Technological Skills Challenge

Virtual Robotics Team of 2:
2011 - Gold Medal at Peel Technological Skills Challenge
2011 - Silver Medal at Ontario Skills Challenge
2012 - Silver Medal at Peel Technological Skills Challenge
2016 - Gold Medal at Peel Technological Skills Challenge

Extracurricular activities

The school offers sports including track and field, volleyball, baseball, soccer, football, badminton and tennis. These sport teams compete in many tournaments throughout Ontario.

The Global Youth Issues Club is a very active club at Fletcher's and hosts events like a cake auction, vow of silence, and Halloween for Hunger during the school year. They are a Free the Children's club that promotes awareness about global issues/causes to youth.

Each year the school hosts an intra-school competition known as the Science Olympics. In it large teams complete a variety of science related challenges that promote teamwork, collaboration, and critical thinking. Teams are composed of students in grades 9-12 and choose their own mascot, name and logo. In the end, the team with the fastest completion time wins. The competition is hosted by the school's science department.

The school recently formed a jazz combo, consisting of eight senior members. As a Fletcher's first, both the Jazz Combo and the school's Concert Band, a large group of music students of all ages, competed in MusicFest 2016, a national music competition across Canada. The groups earned silver and bronze awards, respectively.

Mainstage production
Each year, Fletcher's showcases on a play, musical or variety show. These shows are presented by the Arts Department and have been viewed by such socialites as Angelina Jolie.
2007: Fame - musical
2008: iBelieve - showcase of talent
2009: Stop the Violence -  showcase of arts
2010: 12 Angry Jurors - adaptation of the movie 12 Angry Men
2011: 7 Stories - play written by Morris Panych
2013: ZAP - play by Paul Fleischman
2014: iRemember - original play/musical celebrating the ten year anniversary of the school
2015: The Laramie Project - play by Moisés Kaufman
2016: Fletcher's Winter Talent Showcase - talent show

Notable alumni
 Keshia Chanté
 Doneil Henry
 Tory Lanez
 Winnie Harlow

See also
List of high schools in Ontario

References

External links
 Fletcher's Meadow Secondary School

Peel District School Board
High schools in Brampton
2005 establishments in Ontario
Educational institutions established in 2005